Merkert Gymnasium is a multi-purpose arena in Easton, Massachusetts, USA. It is home to the Stonehill College Skyhawks men's and women's basketball and volleyball teams.

The basketball court is called the Paula Sullivan Court, named after the longtime women's basketball head coach for 25 years (1971–1996), when the Skyhawks posted an overall record of 479–159 (.751) and captured six Northeast-10 Conference championships.

References

Stonehill Skyhawks basketball
College basketball venues in the United States
Basketball venues in Massachusetts
College volleyball venues in the United States